Chrášťany is a municipality and village in Rakovník District in the Central Bohemian Region of the Czech Republic. It has about 700 inhabitants.

Administrative parts
The village of Nový Dvůr is an administrative part of Chrášťany.

References

Villages in Rakovník District